Filacciano is a  (municipality) in the Metropolitan City of Rome in the Italian region of Latium, located about  north of Rome.

Infrastructure and transport

Roads 

The municipal territory, for a short stretch, is also crossed by the Autostrada A1.

References

Cities and towns in Lazio